The Jungle  (1914) is an American drama silent film made by the All-Star Feature Corporation starring George Nash. The film is an adaptation of the 1906 book of the same name by Upton Sinclair, the only one to date. Sinclair reportedly bought the negative of the film prior to 1916, hoping to market the film nationally after its initial release in 1914. Sinclair himself reportedly appears at the beginning and end of the movie, as a sort of endorsement of the film.

The film, from historical accounts at the time of release, included the scene of Jurgis murdering the foreman who raped Jurgis's wife by throwing him over a walkway into a "sea of frightful horns passing beneath him" (cattle). The film was commonly screened at socialist meetings across America at the time.

It is now considered a lost film.

Cast
 George Nash as Jurgis Rudkus
 Gail Kane as Ona
 Julia Hurley as Elzbieta
 Robert Cummings as Connor
 Alice Marc as Marija
 Robert Paton Gibbs as Antanas (as Robert Payton Gibbs)
 Clarence Handyside as John Durham
 E. P. Evers as Freddy Durham (as Ernest Evers)
 George Henry Irving
 Upton Sinclair as himself

See also
 List of American films of 1914
 List of lost films
 The Jungle (1906) novel by Upton Sinclair

References

External links

The Jungle at SilentEra

1914 films
American silent feature films
American black-and-white films
Films based on American novels
Lost American films
1914 drama films
1914 short films
Silent American drama films
Films based on works by Upton Sinclair
1914 lost films
Lost drama films
1910s American films